Phyllops is a genus of bats that includes the Cuban fig-eating bat and two extinct species, both from Cuba as well.

References

Bat genera
Mammal genera with one living species
Phyllostomidae
Taxa named by Wilhelm Peters